Houstonia pusilla (tiny bluet) is a plant in the family Rubiaceae native to the United States and common in the southeastern and central parts of the country, from Texas to Florida north to Delaware and South Dakota, plus an isolated population in Pima County, Arizona.

Houstonia pusilla is a short plant  or less in height with a tiny blue toned, yellow centered four lobed flower with a  diameter. The leaves are opposite and each flower grows from a single branch growing from the leaf axil. This plant requires full sun and blooms in spring and early summer. It is a groundcover multiplying by self sowing and grows in mildly acidic soil where the grass is thin and moisture is adequate to support the plant. Its habitats include dry open places, rocky ledges, granite glades, and outcrops.

References

External links
Houstonia pusilla at the Wildflowers of the SE U.S.Database

pusilla
Flora of the United States
Plants described in 1788
Taxa named by Johann David Schoepff